Ashley Lynn Nick (born October 27, 1987) is an American professional soccer player who plays as a midfielder for Kansas City of the National Women's Soccer League (NWSL).

College career
Nick played college soccer at USC from 2005 to 2008. She scored her first collegiate goal on September 17, 2006 against UNLV. Nick co-captained the USC team that won the 2007 NCAA Women’s Soccer National Championship. Nick was named to the All-Pac-10 First Team in 2007 and 2008.

Club career
She moved to play for FC Twente. There she won the 2010–11 Eredivisie title. In 2012, she moved to Toppserien side Arna-Bjørnar before moving back in 2013 to the United States by joining Pali Blues and later joined Sky Blue FC. On December 12, 2014, she was traded to the Houston Dash for a draft position in the second and fourth rounds of the 2015 NWSL College Draft. On May 11, 2015, she was traded to the Western New York Flash for Defender Toni Pressley.

In the 2015–16 American off-season Nick scored five goals in six Cypriot First Division games with Apollon Limassol. She signed with Sky Blue FC in March 2016 and announced she would be leaving Sky Blue FC June 9, 2016.

On September 27, 2018, she joined Italian Serie A club Juventus.

On March 10, 2021, Nick signed a one-year contract with NWSL expansion club Kansas City.

International career
In February 2008, Nick was called up to represent the United States national under-23 team.

Personal life
Her uncles Bruce Matthews and Clay Matthews Jr. both played in the NFL.

Honors

Club
FC Twente
 Eredivisie
 Winners: 2010–11
 Runners-up: 2011–12
 BeNe Super Cup
 Winners: 2011–12
Juventus
 Serie A
 Winners: 2018–19
 Coppa Italia
 Winners: 2018–19

References

External links
 Ashley Nick profile at National Women's Soccer League
 Ashley Nick profile at Sky Blue FC
 Ashley Nick profile at Houston Dash
 
 Profile at soccerdonna.de 

1987 births
Living people
American LGBT sportspeople
American women's soccer players
LGBT association football players
Houston Dash players
NJ/NY Gotham FC players
Apollon Ladies F.C. players
Pali Blues players
Expatriate women's footballers in Russia
American expatriate sportspeople in Russia
FC Zorky Krasnogorsk (women) players
National Women's Soccer League players
People from Monrovia, California
Soccer players from California
Women's association football midfielders
Western New York Flash players
USC Trojans women's soccer players
FC Twente (women) players
Expatriate women's footballers in the Netherlands
Expatriate women's footballers in Cyprus
Arna-Bjørnar players
Toppserien players
Eredivisie (women) players
Expatriate women's footballers in Norway
American expatriate sportspeople in Norway
American expatriate sportspeople in Cyprus
American expatriate sportspeople in the Netherlands
LGBT people from California
Juventus F.C. (women) players
Expatriate women's footballers in Italy
American expatriate sportspeople in Italy
American expatriate women's soccer players
Lesbian sportswomen
Kansas City Current players
Matthews football family